The World Croquet Federation (WCF) is the world governing body for croquet. Its primary objective is to make the various codes of the game "well-known, well-understood, well-respected and well-supported sports in countries throughout the world". To that end, it encourages, promotes and develops Golf Croquet and Association Croquet internationally at all levels. The WCF sanctions various croquet tournaments for both individuals and national teams, held worldwide, maintains world rankings for individuals and nations, and governs changes to the laws of Association Croquet and the rules of Golf Croquet.

The WCF was first formed in 1986 as a committee spearheaded by members of the English Croquet Association, with the intention of holding a World Championship. The first General Meeting was held alongside the first World Championship in July 1989. At the outset, Australia, England, Ireland, Japan, New Zealand, Scotland, and the USA were Full Members, with Canada, France, Italy, Jersey, and South Africa as Observer Members.

Member Countries 
Croquet playing Nations must satisfy strict criteria prior to membership being accepted by the WCF.

Full Members 

 
 
 
  England
 
 
 
 
 
 
  United States

Associate Members

Recognised Croquet Organisations

World Champions (Singles)

Association Croquet

Women's Association Croquet

Golf Croquet

Women's Golf Croquet

World Champions (Teams)

Association Croquet

Golf Croquet

National Associations 
 Australian Croquet Association
 Croquet Canada
 Egyptian Croquet Federation
 Croquet Association
 Croquet Association of Ireland
 Croquet New Zealand
 Scottish Croquet Association
 South African Croquet Association
 Federación Española de Croquet
 United States Croquet Association
 Austrian Croquet Federation
 Asociace Českomoravského Kroketu
 Deutscher Krocket Bund
 Federazione Italiana Sport Croquet
 Croquet Association of Japan
 Latvijas kroketa federācija
 Norges Croquet Forbund
 Svenska krocketförbundet
 Association Suisse de Croquet
 Welsh Croquet Association
 Croquet Federation of Belgium
 Suomen Krokettiliitto
 Croquet Federation of India
 Jersey Croquet Club
 Русский Kрокет

References

External links
 World Croquet Federation
 Rules of Golf Croquet
 Croquet Records
 Croquet Scores

Croquet
International sports organizations
Sports organizations established in 1986